White Island is an island  off the coast of Otago, within the boundaries of the city of Dunedin, South Island, New Zealand. It is uninhabited, and is a well-known landmark visible from the city's two inner city beaches at St Clair and St Kilda.

Name 
The island's Māori name is Ponuiahine - also given as 'Pomuiahine'. It has been translated, probably too literally, as 'The girl's great night', giving rise to witty suggestions as to why that might be. Goodall and Griffiths suggested it should be understood as 'Pou-nui-a-Hine, referring to a post being a memorial to some significant event involving Hine'. They observe 'Hine' can be a man's name but clearly this suggestion leaves open the original ribald speculations. As a place for a lovers' tryst it seems unpromising.

Ragged Rock 
White Island may be the 'Ragged Rock' where the Sydney sealer Brothers, chartered by Robert Campbell and under the command of Robert Mason landed three men out of a gang of eleven in November 1809. William Tucker who later settled at Whareakeake (Murdering Beach), near Otago Heads, was in the gang. Alternatively Ragged Rock may be Green Island.

1826 sighting 
A man was sent ashore and came back with a Māori man called Tatawa who 'said he belonged to Otago'. Shepherd later confirmed this was the part of the coast he was talking about. There is a reef south of White Island where the sea may be seen breaking. Presumably in the 1820s it too rose well above the sea. By the time of Dunedin's settlement in 1848 there was only the single island visible.

See also

 Desert island
 List of islands of New Zealand
 Lists of islands

References

Uninhabited islands of New Zealand
Geography of Dunedin
Islands of Otago